Smykovo is a rural locality (a village) in Lavrovskoye Rural Settlement, Sudogodsky District, Vladimir Oblast, Russia. The population was 38 as of 2010.

Geography 
Smykovo is located 23 km north of Sudogda (the district's administrative centre) by road. Michurino is the nearest rural locality.

References 

Rural localities in Sudogodsky District